Tasmosalpingus is the only genus in the beetle family Tasmosalpingidae (superfamily Cucujoidea). There are two species in Tasmosalpingus, found in Australia in Tasmania and Victoria. Adults have been collected using malaise traps, while a possible larval specimen was found under the bark of the podocarp Phyllocladus aspleniifolius. Gut contents indicate that they are mycophagous, feeding on fungal hyphae.

Species
These species belong to the genus Tasmosalpingus:
 Tasmosalpingus quadrispilotus Lea, 1919
 Tasmosalpingus promiscuus Lea, 1919

References

Cucujoidea genera